The Treason Act 1795 (sometimes also known as the Treasonable and Seditious Practices Act) (36 Geo. 3 c. 7) was one of the Two Acts introduced by the British government in the wake of the stoning of King George III on his way to open Parliament in 1795, the other being the Seditious Meetings Act 1795. The Act made it high treason to "within the realm or without compass, imagine, invent, devise or intend death or destruction, or any bodily harm tending to death or destruction, maim or wounding, imprisonment or restraint, of the person of ... the King". This was derived from the Sedition Act 1661, which had expired. The 1795 Act was originally a temporary Act which was to expire when George III died, but it was made permanent by the Treason Act 1817.

Some other treasons created by the Act (which also originated with the 1661 Act) were reduced to felonies by the Treason Felony Act 1848, which also extended the 1795 Act to Ireland.

The Act also stipulated that anyone found to have brought either the King, the Constitution or the government into contempt could be transported for a period of 7 years. This clause was repealed by the Statute Law Revision Act 1871.

The rest of the Act was repealed by the Crime and Disorder Act 1998.

See also
 Seditious Meetings Act 1795

References

External links
The Treason Act 1795 (at the time of its repeal in 1998), from the UK Statute Law Database

Treason in the United Kingdom
Great Britain Acts of Parliament 1795